Douglas Herbert Messier (born September 5, 1936) is a Canadian former ice hockey player and coach. He played 487 games in the Western Hockey League, playing with the Seattle Totems, Edmonton Flyers, and Portland Buckaroos. He also played briefly in the American Hockey League for the Pittsburgh Hornets. After his retirement, he became a minor league hockey coach. Messier is the father of Paul Messier and Hockey Hall of Fame player Mark Messier.

References

External links

1936 births
Living people
Canadian ice hockey defencemen
Edmonton Flyers (WHL) players
Pittsburgh Hornets players
Portland Buckaroos players
Ice hockey people from Alberta
Canadian expatriate ice hockey players in the United States